Mike D. Stone (October 24, 1949 - December 3, 2017) was an American recording engineer and record producer. Stone worked with Frank Zappa (multiple albums), Joe Walsh, B. B. King, Bee Gees (multiple albums),  America, Peter Criss, Paul Stanley, and others.

Biography
Stone began his career as a recording engineer at The Record Plant in California in 1969. His uncle Chris Stone co-owned the Record Plant recording studio with Gary Kellgren. From 1981 on, Stone was an independent audio engineer for MDS Audio. From 1985 through 1988 was the chief engineer at the Record Plant in Los Angeles and then worked as music mixer at Lorimar-Columbia-Sony Studios from 1989 until 1993.

Selected discography (incomplete) 
1970 B. B. King – Indianola Mississippi Seeds, engineer 
1970 James Gang – James Gang Rides Again, engineer
1971 Dory Previn – Mythical Kings and Iguanas, engineer
1972 America – Homecoming, engineer
1973 Joe Walsh – The Smoker You Drink, the Player You Get, engineer
1973 Buddy Miles – Chapter VII, engineer 
1973 Bee Gees – Life in a Tin Can, engineer
1972 America – Hat Trick, engineer
1974 Frank Zappa – One Size Fits All, engineer
1974 Frank Zappa – Studio Tan, engineer
1978 Peter Criss – Peter Criss, engineer
1978 Paul Stanley – Paul Stanley, engineer
1980 Daniel Amos – Horrendous Disc, producer, engineer
1987 The Textones – Cedar Creek, producer, engineer 
1998 Barbra Streisand – Funny Lady, engineer

Note
The audio engineering references for Mike D. Stone of the Record Plant recording studio in Los Angeles, California, often get confused and mixed with the references of Mike Stone (record producer) of the United Kingdom who worked at Trident Studios and Abbey Road Studios, and engineered for Queen, Genesis and Asia. And their references sometimes are confused with Mike "Clay" Stone of Clay Records, who worked with largely UK punk and metal acts.

References

External links
 Mike Stone In His Own Words: From Day One | Record Plant Diaries

1949 births
2017 deaths
American record producers
American audio engineers
Bee Gees
Frank Zappa